Himasha Eshan Waththakankanamge is a Sri Lankan sprint athlete specializing in the 200 and 100 metres. He studied at the Kalutara Vidyalaya. He held the South Asian and Sri Lankan records in the 100 m sprint with the time of 10.26 seconds, until September 2020.
Himasha was found positive for banned substance methylhexanamine in 2012 and kept out of the field for one year by Sri Lanka, but he came strong soon after the ban by winning the national championship. His South Asian as well as national record in the men's 100m event was shattered by his fellow compatriot Yupun Abeykoon on 8 September 2020.

Personal life
He was offered training by the Sri Lankan sports ministry in Jamaica in 1997.

See also
List of Sri Lankans by sport

References

1995 births
Living people
Sri Lankan male sprinters
Sri Lankan sportspeople in doping cases
Doping cases in athletics
Commonwealth Games competitors for Sri Lanka
Athletes (track and field) at the 2018 Commonwealth Games
South Asian Games gold medalists for Sri Lanka
South Asian Games gold medalists in athletics